The German locomotives of DRG Class 43 were standard (see Einheitsdampflokomotive) goods train engines with the Deutsche Reichsbahn.

History 
This was the second class that was built on the Einheitslok principle. According to the first classification scheme of the DR's Standardisation Bureau, 2-10-0 goods train locomotives were to be procured with a 20-ton axle load. To achieve this a two-cylinder class (the Class 43) and a three-cylinder class (the Class 44) were envisaged, because it was not yet known which configuration would be more economical. Ten examples of each class were procured in parallel. The Class 43 was supplied by Henschel and by Schwartzkopff.

In trials it was discovered that the Class 43 was more economical to operate at powers under 1500 PSi. As a result, a further 25 examples of the 43 were ordered up to 1928. However, due to the increase in goods train speeds in the 1930s, the Class 44 was given priority thereafter because, in addition to its economy when running at higher speeds and the better running qualities of its three-cylinder driving gear, it was also cleared for running at up to 80 km/h. As a result, no more Class 43s were ordered.

In the literature statements are often found that the locomotive was not sufficiently powerful overall. In response to that, number 43 013 was loaded for testing purposes with a train of 5000 tons - that is more than twice that given in the haulage tables - and headed it without complaint. In doing so, 43 013 is a record holder. Never before or since has any German locomotive hauled such a load.

The Class 43s, which had operating numbers 43 001 - 43 035, all remained with the DR in East Germany after the Second World War. In 1960, the remaining engines were once again modernised, the powerful boiler even enabled goods trains greater than the maximum allowable load to be hauled. This led, however, to frame damage, that the Reichsbahn could not repair. So the machines were rapidly retired, the last one being taken out of service in 1968 at Cottbus locomotive depot. Locomotive 43 001 became a museum locomotive and belongs to the Dresden Transport Museum, but is in the Saxon Railway Museum, a former home depot of the Class 43.

The engines of this class were equipped with a 2'2' T 32 tender.

See also 
 List of DRG locomotives and railbuses
 List of preserved steam locomotives in Germany

Notes

References

Further reading 

43
2-10-0 locomotives
43
Henschel locomotives
Railway locomotives introduced in 1926
Berliner locomotives
Freight locomotives
Standard gauge locomotives of Germany
1′E h2 locomotives